Virsa Singh Valtoha is an Indian politician and belongs to Shiromani Akali Dal party. He is a former member of the Punjab Legislative Assembly who represented Khem Karan.
He was former Chief spokesperson of Shiromani Akali Dal and also served as District President of the party.

Family
His father's name is Sohan Singh. Virsa Singh Valtoha's son's name is Mr. Gauravdeep Singh, who is advocate at Punjab And Haryana High Court. He is also the president of SOI (Student Organization Of India) from Majha Zone (Punjab).

Political career
Valtoha was elected to the Punjab Legislative Assembly from the Valtoha constituency in 2007. During the 2012 Punjab election, Valtoha constituency underwent boundary delimitation. Valtoha then successfully contested the Punjab Assembly seat from Khem Karan.

Casteism
Valtoha has been filmed insulting dalits, a historically discriminated community of lower caste people placed at the end of the caste pyramid, who constitute 36% of the states population in India.

References

Living people
Shiromani Akali Dal politicians
Indian Sikhs
Punjab, India MLAs 2007–2012
Punjab, India MLAs 2012–2017
Year of birth missing (living people)
People from Tarn Taran district
Place of birth missing (living people)